Nata de coco, also marketed as coconut gel, is a chewy, translucent, jelly-like food produced by the fermentation of coconut water, which gels through the production of microbial cellulose by Komagataeibacter xylinus. 

Originating in the Philippines, nata de coco was invented in 1949 by Teódula Kalaw África as an alternative to the traditional Filipino nata de piña made from pineapples. It is most commonly sweetened as a candy or dessert, and can accompany a variety of foods, including pickles, drinks, ice cream, puddings, and fruit cocktails.

Etymology

Nata de coco means "cream of coconut" in Spanish.

History
Nata de coco was invented in 1949 by Teódula Kalaw África, a Filipina chemist working for the National Coconut Corporation (now the Philippine Coconut Authority). It was originally conceived as an alternative to nata de piña, another gel-like Filipino dessert produced since the 18th century. This was because though the demand was high, nata de piña was seasonal, as it relied on pineapple harvests from the declining piña fibre industry.

Commercial production of nata de coco began in 1954, when the agency, renamed the Philippine Coconut Administration, opened a branch in Alaminos, Laguna and introduced the technology to local farmers. Nata de coco production was later optimized in the mid-1970s through the efforts of a team of microbiologists led by Priscilla C. Sánchez. In the 20th century, the demand for coconuts increased. Products from coconuts became a major export product of the Philippines, including nata de coco.

Nutrition
Nata de coco is mainly made from coconut water and so has a modest nutritional profile. One cup of it (118 grams) contains 109 calories, 1 gram of protein, and 7 grams of carbohydrates. It is often characterized as healthy since it contains dietary fiber to aid digestion while carrying fewer calories compared to other desserts, gram for gram.

Production
Commercially made nata de coco is made by small farms in the Philippines, especially in Laguna and Quezon, as well as Thailand, Vietnam, Malaysia, and Indonesia, especially in Yogyakarta. It is commonly sold in jars.

The primarily coconut water dessert is produced through the following steps:
Extraction of the coconut water,
Fermentation of the coconut water with bacterial cultures,
Separation and cutting of the produced surface layer of nata de coco,
Cleaning and washing off the acetic acid,
Cutting and packaging

Dessert
Nata de coco can be consumed on its own, but it can be used as an ingredient as well for fruit salads, halo-halo, coconut cakes, ice creams, soft drinks, bubble tea, and yogurts.

See also
Macapuno
Coconut sprout

References

External links
Case Study on Nata de coco Boom in the Philippines

Plant-based fermented foods
Philippine desserts
Foods containing coconut
Jams and jellies
1949 introductions